Otello Profazio (born 26 December 1934) is an Italian cantastorie, folk singer-songwriter and author.

Biography
Born Otello Ermanno Profazio in Rende, Province of Cosenza, Profazio debuted in 1953,  participating at the radio musical contest "Il microfono è vostro" with the song "U' Ciucciu". A divulgator of traditional folk music of the South Italy, particularly of Sicily and Calabria, in 1964 he got a large critical acclaim with the album Il treno del sole , consisting of Ignazio Buttitta's poems set to music; the album also marked the start of a progressive evolution of his style, which became more original and distinguishing. His career had its peak in the 1970s, with the success of the albums Il brigante Musolino (a musical recount of life events of Giuseppe Musolino)  and  Qua si campa d'aria, which sold over a million copies and was awarded gold disc. From the 1980s he focused his activities on live performances and concerts.

Profazio also presented several television music programs, notably Quando la gente canta for five years on Secondo Canale. For 15 years he also wrote a weekly column ("Profaziate") in the newspaper Gazzetta del Sud, whose contents were later collected in a series of books.

References

Further reading

External links
 
 
 

1936 births
People from Rende
Living people
Italian male singers
Italian folk singers
Italian singer-songwriters
Italian record producers
Sicilian-language singers